Matt Adamczyk (June 9, 1978) is an American businessman and politician, who served as the 35th Wisconsin State Treasurer.

Early life
Adamczyk grew up in Wauwatosa, Wisconsin on June 9, 1978. He went to Pius XI High School in Milwaukee, Wisconsin and received his bachelor's degree from University of Wisconsin–Madison in 2000.

Career
He helped manage his family business, Adamczyk Heating and Cooling and owns a home rental property business. Adamczyk was also an advisor to Republican members of the Wisconsin State Legislature, including Senator Leah Vukmir and Representative Tyler August.

Wisconsin Treasurer 
On November 4, 2014, Adamczyk was elected Wisconsin State Treasurer succeeding Kurt W. Schuller who did not seek re-election. Adamczyk ran on a platform of removing the office, stating, "The antiquated office no longer is needed and has become a prime example of wasteful government spending." Adamczyk has been vociferously opposed to climate conservation programs, even seeking to punish and censor coworkers who had been assigned to work on such projects, including Tia Nelson. After entering office, Adamczyk cut two positions in the office but continued to draw his $70,000 a year salary while campaigning against the existence of the office. Adamczyk succeeded in lobbying the state legislature for a constitutional amendment eliminating the role of State Treasurer. However, the referendum held in the April 2018 election failed by a margin of 61.75% voting no (to retain the state treasurer office) and 38.25% voting yes.

According to public reports by Wisconsin Attorney General Brad Schimel and Wisconsin Secretary of State Doug La Follette, Adamczyk verbally abused and harassed staff in the Board of Commissioners of Public Lands office.  He declined to seek reelection in the 2018 election, in which Sarah Godlewski was elected to succeed him in January 2019.

Wisconsin Assembly Campaign 
In the November 2018 election, Adamczyk ran for a seat in the Wisconsin State Assembly representing the 14th District. He was narrowly defeated in the election by Democrat Robyn Vining.

Electoral history

Notes

1978 births
21st-century American politicians
Businesspeople from Wisconsin
Living people
Politicians from Milwaukee
People from Wauwatosa, Wisconsin
State treasurers of Wisconsin
University of Wisconsin–Madison alumni
Wisconsin Republicans